Deanshanger is a village and civil parish in West Northamptonshire, west-northwest of Milton Keynes. In 2007 it was joined with the civil parish of Wicken to form Deanshanger ward, returning two councillors. The population of the civil parish (including Puxley) at the 2011 census was 3,817.

History
Deanshanger used to be called Daneshanger, "hanger" being an old English word, meaning a clearing in the woods – hence Daneshanger was a clearing in the woods where the Danes lived.

The original population centre of the parish was the hamlet of Passenham. However, from the late 18th century the coming of the Grand Union Canal to the east made Deanshanger an agricultural industrial centre causing it to grow quickly. This growth accelerated with the building of the London and Birmingham Railway in the first half of the 19th century which passed through the nearby villages of Wolverton, Bletchley and Roade.

After a fall out with Henry II in 1170 AD, Thomas Becket is said to have sought refuge in the Gilbertine Monastery in Deanshanger (or Dinneshangra as it was then known). Although disguised as a peasant, he was nevertheless recognised by a farm labourer. At the time the only water supply in the village was foul and brackish, and having heard of the miracle that Becket was said to have performed at nearby Northampton, the farm labourer pleaded with Becket to repeat the performance. Becket is said to have looked towards Heaven, struck the ground with his staff, and immediately a fresh spring appeared. This is one of 703 miracles that is said to have led to his canonisation.

The school, a sports college, merged with former Roade school in September 2011, and was renamed The Elizabeth Woodville School.

Demography
At the time of the 2001 census, Deanshanger parish had a population of 2,900 citizens and in 2010 was estimated to be 3,877, falling to 3,817 at the 2011 census.

Industry
From the 1820s, the main industry in the village was an iron foundry and later an iron oxide works (making pigment for paint). This gave some of the surrounding area a red colouration from the oxide dust. However, in 1999, the works closed and was demolished. By 2008, most of the works land has been replaced by the construction of several new housing estates. Extensive remedial work was needed to reverse the harmful effects of the previous industrial use of the site there are still signs of the red stained oxide all around the village. Some land has designated for light industrial use.

Local Amenities
The village has a village hall and community centre (extended in 2008) to provide a venue for events and facilities for community groups, a doctor's surgery, a library, and a cafe. Other amenities include two pre-schools, a primary school, and a secondary school, the aforementioned Elizabeth Woodville School, which is split over two sites across the town. The schools' grounds include the site of a Roman villa.

There is a parish church (Holy Trinity, Church of England) and a Methodist chapel, a post office, a pub and two members' clubs (sports and social, Conservative club), a pharmacy, a hairdresser, a pizza and kebab takeaway, a Chinese and fish and chips takeaway, a mobile takeaway, and other village stores and newsagent's shops including a greengrocers. In December 2015, The Co-operative Food opened a store on the High Street, where The Fox & Hounds Public House was situated, previously planned to be a Morrisons. On the edge of the village on the A422, is a golf and country club, a hotel, an Indian restaurant and a petrol and service station. The town has a parish council office, which is a former school and Baptist Church, which was renovated in 2008.

Football

The village is home to Deanshanger Athletic Football Club, founded in 1946. The club consists of two men's teams (First and Reserves) who play in the North Bucks & District Football League, an under 18's team, competing in the Milton Keynes Youth Football League, and as of June 2017, a Ladies team, the first time the club has offered ladies football at a senior level. For children, there is a pre-school playgroup, youth club, and the junior football club, Deanshanger Colts.

Annual Celebrations

The village's annual event is a revival of the historic Feast held on a Saturday afternoon and evening in October each year. This includes a fun fair, stalls and firework show.

There is an active village heritage society that organises the Feast, the planting of spring flowers on the roads into the village in autumn, cleaning of the stream (the King's Brook) in spring and carol singing in December.

Transport
There are two regular bus services between Deanshanger and Milton Keynes - the 89/X89, operated by Stagecoach and running hourly between 6:00-19:00 Monday to Friday, and 8:00-18:00 Saturday only - and the 90/90A, which are operated by UNO on weekdays and Saturdays and run between 8:00-15:30 every two hours. There are also bus services between MK and Deanshanger and Buckingham on Friday and Saturday nights, running from 19:00-1:00AM. These are also operated by Stagecoach. Finally, there is the 83, a school service open to the public which runs from Deanshanger to Buckingham once a day (8:00AM), and Buckingham to Deanshanger (5:30PM). This bus also stops at Silverstone UTC, and is operated by a Stagecoach double decker. On a Sunday Country Lion operate a menagerie of the 89 and the 90, numbered 90, which operates at a far reduced frequency but stops at a combination of the stops on both routes.

School bus services operate additionally between Deanshanger and Buckingham, stopping at Buckingham School and The Royal Latin School. This is the 943, operated by Bucks County Council, contracted out to Marshall's Coaches. It leave Deanshanger in convoy at 8:10, and generally leave Buckingham (Via RLS) at about 15:45, arriving back at 16:00.

The nearest railway station is Wolverton for services to London Euston railway station, Bletchley, Milton Keynes, Northampton, Birmingham and north. Milton Keynes railway station (on the same line) is the nearest station to give access to fast trains to London (40 minutes), intercity and cross-country services. There are several private hire taxi services.

See also
 Wolverton and Stony Stratford Tramway

References

External links

 Short history of Deanshanger
 Deanshanger Village Heritage Society
 Village web site
 Deanshanger Parish Council web site
 Holy Trinity Church Deanshanger web site
 Deanshanger Conservative Club web site

Villages in Northamptonshire
History of Northamptonshire
West Northamptonshire District
Civil parishes in Northamptonshire